The Fairs Act 1871 (34 & 35 Vict c 12) is an Act of the Parliament of the United Kingdom. It empowered the Secretary of State for the Home Department in the United Kingdom to, on petition, make orders for the abolition of fairs. Such provision was made at this time by Parliament because many fairs traditionally held in early Victorian England were, according to the preamble to the act, held to be

unnecessary, 
the cause of grievous immorality, and 
very injurious to the inhabitants of the towns in which such fairs are held

Fairs abolished under the act included Ickleton Fair in Cambridgeshire and St Matthew's Fair in Bury St Edmunds, Suffolk.

References

 

Fairs in the United Kingdom
United Kingdom Acts of Parliament 1871